Mohammad Yousuf Abul Farah Tartusi was a popular Sufi Muslim saint. He is regarded as one of the common ancestors of the Sufi Tariqahs, which form an unbroken chain to the Islamic prophet Muhammad.

Biography
Mohammad Yousuf Abul Farah Tartusi born on August 21, 1016 CE (15 Rabi ul Awwal 407 AH) in Tartus, Syria. His father's name was Shaikh Abdullah bin Younus Tartusi. His given name was Mohammad Yousuf, while his patronymic was Abul Farah. He is sometimes given the title Alauddin.

He was known as a Qutb, which in Sufism is a perfect human being, otherwise known as al-insān al-kāmil, "The Universal Man" at  the top of the saintly hierarchy. of his time known for performing miracles. He was said to have had such intense level of tawakkul and sabr that worldly matters did not concern him.

His spiritual successor was Shaikh Abul Hassan Ali bin Mohammad Qureshi Hakkari.

Abul Farah Tartusi died on October 28, 1055 CE (3 Sha'aban 447 AH), during the Abbasid Caliphate. His mausoleum is in Baghdad, Iraq.

Spiritual lineage
Silsila:
Muhammad
Ali ibn Abu Talib
Hasan al-Basri
Habib al Ajami
Dawud Tai
Maruf Karkhi
Sirri Saqti
Junaid Baghdadi
Abu Bakr Shibli
Abdul Aziz bin Hars bin Asad Yemeni Tamimi
Abul Fazal Abdul Wahid Yemeni Tamimi
Mohammad Yousuf Abu al-Farah Tartusi

Titles
 ANWAR SUFIA (Light of Sufis).
 SHAJR TUL KAMILEEN (Head of the Perfected Ones).
 KHAZEENA AL ASFIYA (Treasure of Purity).

Further reading
Crimingham, J. Spencer. The Sufi Orders in Islam. Oxford University Press, New York, 1998. 
Tazkira Mashaikh Qadria, Mohammad Deen Kaleem, Noori Kutb Khana Lahore, Pakistan.
Tareekh Mashaikh Qadria, Mohammad Sadiq Kasuri, Zawia Publications Lahore, Pakistan.
Tazkira Mashaikh Qadria Fazila, Asrar Al-Hasan Qadri, Tasawwuf Foundation Lahore, Pakistan, .

References

External links
 International Qadiri Tariqah: Silsilah of the Qadiri Order

1055 deaths
Ascetics
Syrian Sufis
People from Tartus
Syrian Sufi saints
1016 births